The Great Train Robbery is a bestselling 1975 historical novel written by Michael Crichton, his third novel under his own name and his thirteenth novel overall. Originally published in the US by Alfred A. Knopf (then a division of Random House), it was later published by Avon, an imprint of HarperCollins Publishers. The novel tells the story of the Great Gold Robbery of 1855, a massive gold heist that takes place on a train travelling through Victorian-era England on 22 May 1855. Most of the book takes place in London. A 1978 film adaptation was written for the screen and directed by Crichton.

Plot
In 1854, master thief Edward Pierce plans to steal a shipment of gold worth more than £12,000 being transported monthly from London to the Crimean War front. The bank has locked the gold in two custom-built safes, each with two locks, thus requiring a total of four keys to open. He recruits Robert Agar, a specialist in copying keys, as an accomplice.

Pierce's first target is the key held by bank president Edgar Trent. Through painstaking surveillance, conversations with bank employees and a deliberately bungled pickpocketing attempt, Pierce deduces that Trent's key is kept at his mansion. With the assistance of his longtime mistress, an actress known only as "Miss Miriam", and his loyal associate, a buck cabby named Barlow, Pierce and Agar successfully break into Trent's home and wine cellar by night and make a wax impression of the key.

Bank manager Henry Fowler contracts syphilis and asks his friend Pierce to aid him in seeking a remedy: sleeping with a virgin. After supposedly making the necessary arrangements through a madam (actually "Miss Miriam") and charging Fowler the exorbitant price of one hundred fifty guineas, Pierce and Agar make an impression of Fowler's key, which he always carries with him around his neck but takes off and leaves with his clothes during the assignation.

The other two keys are kept in a shipping department office at London Bridge Station. Pierce helps burglar "Clean Willy" Williams escape from Newgate Prison and the criminals succeed in making wax copies of the two keys at the railway station, completing the job with only seconds to spare before detection. Now possessing copies of all four keys, Pierce bribes Burgess, the poorly paid train guard who rides in the baggage van containing the safes. Agar is then able to perform a dry run of the theft on 17 February 1855, making sure that the copied keys work perfectly.

The actual robbery is scheduled for May 22nd, but Pierce's plans are again disrupted when "Clean Willy" suddenly turns police informant. Pierce's cabby Barlow murders Willy before he can reveal the most crucial information, although Willy has told enough to cause Edward Harranby, a very senior Scotland Yard detective, to deduce that a major robbery is planned. Through careful manipulation of another informant, Pierce diverts the police's attention to an alleged robbery of the transatlantic cable company's payroll in Greenwich, leaving the thieves free and clear to finally strike.

By the next day, much of England is in an uproar upon the discovery of the robbery, with every organisation involved in the gold shipment blaming each other, few leads as to the true culprits and no idea how it was done. The members of the gang drop out of sight.

Eighteen months later, Agar's mistress, who has been caught in the act of robbing a drunk, informs on Agar to escape imprisonment. Agar, who has been arrested on an unrelated charge, turns informant after being threatened by Harranby with transportation to Australia. Pierce and Burgess are arrested at a prize-fighting event in Manchester, and all three are ultimately convicted. Pierce is sentenced to a long prison term, but escapes while being transported from court and disappears, along with the money from the Great Train Robbery.

Characters
 Edward Pierce - professional burglar who poses as a gentleman amongst his upper-class acquaintances in Victorian England. Pierce is arguably one of the most mysterious characters found in Crichton's works as almost nothing is known about his background; indeed even his name is likely false as others also refer to him as "John Simms" along with other titles. Nonetheless, his actions and thoughts in the book consistently demonstrate a sharp intelligence and broad knowledge which far outstrips that of his fellow criminals; perhaps his greatest asset is an ability to easily navigate through both the British underworld and the aristocracy. Throughout the planning and the execution of the Great Train Robbery, Pierce is always cautious, never truly trusting anyone—this caution is eventually justified as it is Agar, his closest accomplice, who finally sells him out.
 Robert Agar - A twenty-six-year-old screwsman (criminal who is skilled with copying keys and picking locks) at the beginning of the novel, Agar is pivotal to the eventual success of the Great Train Robbery, though he is also largely responsible for the culprits' eventual capture. He is apparently very well-acquainted with many criminals and helps Pierce identify many persons of interest including the informant Chokee Bill as well as the snakesman Clean Willy. Though he becomes a police informant at the end of the book in hopes of avoiding transportation to Australia, the judge sends him there anyway and he dies a wealthy man. Michael Crichton depicts Robert Agar as Pierce's lackey with limited intelligence, though his real life counterpart actually masterminded much of the robbery and got away with minor punishment.
 Clean Willy - generally acknowledged to be the best snakesman available in London although his skills were apparently inadequate to prevent arrest and incarceration (which occurred at least twice before and during the story). Edward Pierce goes to great expense to help Willy escape from a high-security prison for the sole purpose of enlisting the snakesman's aid in the train robbery. After successfully completing his tasks, Willy is paid off by Pierce and disappears for some time from the narrative before resurfacing as a police informant, almost jeopardizing the entire scheme. Ultimately he is garroted by Barlow in a boardinghouse.
 Barlow - a violent thug and former mugger who serves Edward Pierce loyally as a cabby, although his services are also employed for other purposes, such as the murder of Clean Willy. He and Miss Miriam manage to elude capture by the authorities, eventually rescuing Pierce from the authorities before the trio completely disappears.
 Miss Miriam - Edward Pierce's mistress who is generally regarded as highly attractive by other characters in the book. She is also a talented actress and plays rather brief though important roles in the execution of the train robbery (such as pretending Agar is her dead brother and distracting Mr. Fowler while Pierce unlocks the baggage car). In many ways, she and Pierce are very similar and well suited for each other: both are resourceful and possess the ability to mix with men and women of all classes.

Background
Crichton became aware of the story when lecturing at Cambridge University. He later read the transcripts of the court trial and started researching the historical period.

Historical deviations
The story is a fictionalised representation of the historical events that happened, although the setting can be considered quite accurate. The characters' names are changed in the novel; for example, the main protagonist William Pierce is changed to Edward Pierce and Edward Agar to Robert Agar. Crichton stated that he did not want to be constrained by what actually happened. The true story of the robbery can be found in David C. Hanrahan's book The First Great Train Robbery.

Reception
The New York Times called it "Mr Crichton's best thriller to date." The Los Angeles Times described it as "marvellous fun."

The book was one of the biggest best selling novels in the US in 1975.

Three audiobook versions have been released:
 an abridged version read by Michael Cumpsty released on audio cassette in 1996 by Random House.
 two unabridged versions on CD, one read by Simon Prebble and released by Recorded Books, LLC in 2000 and one read by Michael Kitchen and released by Brilliance Audio in 2015.

Film adaptation

The novel was later made into a 1978 film entitled The First Great Train Robbery directed by Crichton starring Sean Connery as Pierce, Donald Sutherland as Agar and Lesley-Anne Down as Miriam. Unlike the real incident, only Pierce is captured and tried and all of the protagonists are seen to escape to freedom after the trial. The film was nominated for Best Cinematography Award for the British Society of Cinematographers, and the film was also nominated for Best Motion Picture by the Edgar Allan Poe award by the Mystery Writers Association of America. The film score by Jerry Goldsmith was short, but a favourite in the composer's repertoire and an extended version of the music was released in 2004.

References

1975 American novels
American crime novels
American novels adapted into films
Novels by Michael Crichton
Alfred A. Knopf books
Fiction set in 1855
Novels set in London
Novels set on trains

ja:大列車強盗